The Trusts are a group of two community-owned organisations (licensing trusts) with a near monopoly on the sale of alcohol in West Auckland. They are one of the largest alcohol retailers in New Zealand.

The Portage Licensing Trust covers the areas bordered by New Lynn, Waikumete Cemetery, Glen Eden and Titirangi. The Waitākere Licensing Trust covers the communities around Glendene, Piha, Henderson, Te Atatu and Kumeu.

The Trusts operate all hotels, taverns and off-licenses in their districts. They operate 18 liquor stores under the own West Liquor brand, four store under the Village Wine & Spirits brand, and three stores as LiquorLand franchises. The WestLiquor online shop provides click-and-collect and delivery.

The only other businesses permitted to sell alcohol are liquor stores that operated in the area before 1972, or businesses that make alcohol such as wineries and breweries.

Trustees are elected through local body elections, and surplus profits are returned to the community through grants, rebates, sponsorships and community initiatives. The monopoly of The Trusts can only be removed if a privately organised petition signed by at least 15% of all eligible voters forces a referendum, and at least 50% of all eligible voters on polling day.

History

The Trusts were established in 1972 as a community-led initiative to control the sale of alcohol.

The Trusts Stadium, one of The Trust's most significant investments. opened in September 2004. It cost $28 million to complete but opened debt-free, with The Trusts providing $5 million. The stadium attracts hundreds of thousands of people every year, hosting a range of events, including concerts, sporting events and community gatherings.

Between July 2010 and June 2013, The Trusts invested $30.7 million from its gaming machines into local causes.

By 2013, The Trusts were generating $100 million a year in sales and employing 400 people.

In 2021, The Trusts reached an agreement with Foodstuffs to operate a new LiquorLand franchise and convert some of its existing West Liquor stores to LiquorLand franchisees.

In October 2021, an action group opposed to The Trusts said it almost had enough signatures to force a vote in the Waitākere Licensing Trust area. The group claimed The Trusts' monopoly was stopping bars and restaurants from establishing in on the Te Atatū Peninsula.

The Trusts was the first New Zealand business to boycott Russian products in response to the Russian invasion of Ukraine. On 1 March 2022, it removed all Russian vodkas and beers from shelves, putting Ukrainian flags in their space. Foodstuffs introduced a similar policy in all other LiquorLand stores three days later.

Trustees
The most recent election for trustees took place in 2022, wherein the following trustees were returned:

Portage Licensing Trust (2022-2025)

Waitākere Licensing Trust (2022-2025)

References

External links
 Official website

Alcohol distribution retailers in New Zealand
Retail companies established in 1972
Alcohol in New Zealand
Community organizations
Organisations based in Auckland